The 2013 Rutgers Scarlet Knights football team represented Rutgers University  in the 2013 NCAA Division I FBS football season.  The Scarlet Knights played their home games at High Point Solutions Stadium in Piscataway, NJ as a member of the American Athletic Conference. This was the second season with Kyle Flood as the head coach, and last season before transitioning to playing in the Big Ten Conference. They finished the season 6–7, 3–5 in American Athletic play to finish in a tie for sixth place. They were invited to the Pinstripe Bowl where they were defeated by Notre Dame. Notre Dame would later vacate the win on November 22, 2016 due to academic violations.

Previous season
They enter after finishing last season 9–4, 5–2 in Big East play to win the school's first ever Big East Conference football championship, sharing the conference title with Cincinnati, Louisville, and Syracuse.

Coaching staff
Rutgers head coach Kyle Flood enters his second year as the Scarlet Knights' head coach for the 2013 season (eighth year on the coaching staff overall). During his first year as head coach, he led the Scarlet Knights to an overall record of 9 wins and 4 losses (9–4) and the 2012 Big East Championship as co-champions with Louisville, Syracuse, and Cincinnati.  Flood was awarded as co-Big East Head Coach of the year.

Coaching changes

Departures from 2012
Former offensive coordinator Dave Brock accepted an offer to become the head coach of the Delaware Blue Hens.

Former defensive coordinator Robb Smith accepted an offer to become linebackers coach of the Tampa Bay Buccaneers.

Former tight ends coach Darnell Dinkins "left to pursue other interests".

Additions and promotions
Ron Prince, former head coach of the Kansas State Wildcats and most recently an offensive line coach with the Indianapolis Colts and Jacksonville Jaguars of the National Football League (NFL) was hired as offensive coordinator.  Dave Cohen was promoted from linebackers coach to defensive coordinator, a position he has held previously with Western Michigan, Delaware, and Fordham.  Darrell Wilson was hired away from Iowa, where he coached in the Big Ten Conference for twelve years, to coach defensive backs in his home state of New Jersey.

Departures after regular season
At the conclusion of the regular season, Dave Cohen, Rob Spence, and Damian Wroblewski were fired by the university.

Coaching staff

Schedule

Game summaries

Fresno State

Rutgers opted to attempt a two-point conversion to win the game in overtime.  The two point conversion was not successful, and Fresno State won in overtime.

Norfolk State

Eastern Michigan

Quarterback Gary Nova left the game during the first quarter with a concussion, being relieved by Chas Dodd.  After games of 182, 119, and 192 rushing yards, Sophomore walk-on Paul James led the country in rushing.

Arkansas

SMU

Louisville

Houston

Temple

Cincinnati

Central Florida

UConn

South Florida

Notre Dame (Pinstripe Bowl)

References

Rutgers
Rutgers Scarlet Knights football seasons
Rutgers Scarlet Knights football